Regina Shamvili  is an American concert pianist and an artist of the United States Department of State, born in Tbilisi, Georgia.
 
Shamvili graduated from both the Tbilisi State Conservatory and the Moscow Conservatory. Studied with such legendary pianists as Maria Grinberg, Yakov Flier and Grigory Ginzburg. Recordings on the Melodia label in Russia.

Shamvili has been a citizen of the United States since 1983. Concerts in over one hundred countries around the world. Venues ranging from Concord Pavilion in California to Teatro Coloseo in Buenos Aires to medieval Teatro Olimpico di Vicenza... Recordings on the PolyGram (Netherlands) and VDE-Gallo Records (Switzerland).

The US Ambassador of goodwill for the United States. Cultural programs under auspices the US Embassies around the world. "She reinforced the important role of culture in our bilateral relationship and marked a milestone in our cultural exchange activities" - John Negroponte.

UNESCO sponsored concerts in Asia and Africa. The first Western musician in recent times to give live performances in the Saudi Arabia - BBC Music Magazine. Command performances at the White House, Vatican City and Castel Gandolfo...

Artist's international appeal documented by the Bureau of Public Affairs in a special TV presentation;
TROS (The Netherlands), BRTN (Belgium), Russia Today TV programs aired by National TV channels. CNN worldwide coverage of a return performance in Moscow.

External links 
 Charitable programs with Mother Teresa's Missionaries of Charity in Kolkata (Calcutta).

Classical pianists from Georgia (country)
Women pianists from Georgia (country)
American women classical pianists
American classical pianists
Moscow Conservatory alumni
Soviet emigrants to the United States
Musicians from Tbilisi
Living people
21st-century classical pianists
21st-century American women pianists
21st-century American pianists
Year of birth missing (living people)